Zlatograd is a town in Smolyan Province, southern-central Bulgaria. It is the administrative centre of the homonymous Zlatograd Municipality. In December 2009, the town had a population of 7,110. 

It is located 60 km from  the province centre of Smolyan. The Greek border is 5 km from the town. The cross-border Zlatograd - Thermes (Greece) road was inaugurated on 15 January 2010.

History
During the rule of the Ottoman Empire, the area was a township of the Ottoman Sanjak of Gümülcine in Adrianople Vilayet between 1867 and 1912 known as Darıdere. The town still retains its characteristic Ottoman-era architecture, with numerous old buildings as well as two 19th-century Orthodox churches and a mosque.

Geography
Zlatograd is located in a valley between the eastern and central massif of the Rhodope mountains. 

The municipality's climate is included in the transient-Mediterranean climate region.
Mineral resources include lead-zinc ore.

The territory of the municipality is crossed by Varbitza river which is 98.1 km long and its catchment basin is 1202.8 km. Nedelinska and Kushlenska rivers are tributaries of Varbitza. There is a dam lake called "Zlatograd" with water capacity of 4,4.106 m . and a micro dam lake called "Hasidere" (0,4.106 m).

Forest covers an area of 144.60 km2. Species including beech, hornbeam, oak, birch and cornel-tree are mostly spread among the broad-leaved forests. Prevailing coniferous trees are spruce, fir-tree, white and black pine.

Agriculture covers 25 km2 and the arable land is 12 km2. The cultures grown in the municipality are tobacco, potatoes, vegetables and strawberries (representatives of perennial plants).

There is a tailings pond called "Erma Reka" which is 8 km away from the town of Zlatograd and 5 km away from the village of Erma Reka. The municipality is rich in underground resources. In the surroundings of Erma Reka there is a geothermal deposit of hot mineral water.

Soils are maroon forest leached (97.59 km2); brown forest-dark (12 km2); brown forest-transient (83.37 km2); brown forest light (117.59 km2); alluvial-delluvial (0.59 km2); humus-carbonate (11.07 km2).

Demographics
The rate of unemployment is 32.64%, which is the highest since 1990. The active population is 8,063 of whom 50,97% are employed in the public sector and 49.03% in the private sector.

Honour
Zlatograd Rock on Livingston Island in the South Shetland Islands, Antarctica is named after Zlatograd.

Gallery

References

External links
 Zlatograd.com
 Ethnographic Area Complex Zlatograd
 New Site Ethnographic Area Complex Zlatograd
 Zlatograd Municipality Website
 15 January 2010: Thermes-Zlatograd Road Inaugurated
 Zlatograd and the new Border road into Thermes and Xanthi Northern Greece

Towns in Bulgaria
Cities and towns in the Rhodopes
Populated places in Smolyan Province
Bulgaria–Greece border crossings